The Radio People is an American broadcasting company, which owns and operates radio stations in Louisiana, Alabama, Florida and Mississippi.

Radio Stations
 WUSJ - 96.3 - Country - Jackson, MS
 WJKK - 98.7 - Adult contemporary - Jackson, MS
 KRVV - 100.1 - Hip-hop - Monroe, LA
 WYOY - 101.7 - Top-40 - Jackson, MS
 KMVX - 101.9 - Urban AC - Monroe, LA
 KJLO - 104.1 - Country - Monroe, LA
 KLIP - 105.3 - Classic Hits - Monroe, LA
 KMLB - 540 - Talk - Monroe, LA
 WMOG - 910 - Urban gospel - Meridian, MS
 KRJO - 1680 - Classic country - Monroe, LA

External links
 

Mass media in Monroe, Louisiana
Mass media companies established in 2008
Radio broadcasting companies of the United States
2008 establishments in Louisiana